is a Japanese tokusatsu drama produced by Tsuburaya Productions. It is the 31st entry to the Ultra Series, the first series released in the Reiwa period and the seventh entry to the  lineup. It began airing on TV Tokyo on July 6, 2019.

Synopsis

12 years prior, Tregear incapacitated the New Generation Heroes after misleading them to a minefield asteroid. Inheriting their powers, the Tri-Squad attempted to continue the battle but it leads to their particles scattered in outer space. Taiga's particle of light merged with a young boy named Hiroyuki to save him from a fall after his Guesra companion "Chibisuke" was kidnapped.

In the present day, Hiroyuki joined a private security organization E.G.I.S. (Enterprise of Guard and Investigation Services) to handle extraterrestrial cases while living in a society mixed with aliens from various point of origin. While handling a Villain Guild-related case, a fully recuperated Taiga awakens and therefore allows Hiroyuki to transform in order to combat giant monsters as two other Tri-Squad members, Titas and Fuma made their way to Earth and bonded with the former as a shared host. Tregear on the other hand was revealed to have been anticipating the Tri-Squad's arrival and orchestrated several monster and alien attacks for his own twisted enjoyment of tormenting others. In the middle of the series, his true agenda was revealed to corrupt Taiga into an evil Ultraman in order to fulfill his twisted vendetta against the former's father, Taro. Hiroyuki and the Tri-Squad's sheer bond purified Taiga and gave them the ability to fuse into Ultraman Taiga Tri-Strium. Growing desperate for the situation, Tregear initially tries to harass the E.G.I.S. members and eventually summoned the planet-devouring monster Woola to Earth for his final endgame to consume both light and darkness.

As the tension between humans and aliens begin to grow, Pirika's attempt to sacrifice herself in order to eliminate Woola leads to the realization that it was only cursed by its own hunger. Former Villain Guild members Alien Magma and Merkind offer their assistance to neutralize Woola as Taiga fed the monster with his and Tregear's energy, ending the monster's life in a peaceful way. After rejecting his last chance at redemption, Tregear fought against Taiga Tri-Strium and seemingly obliterated by exposing himself to the Quattro Squad Blaster, seeing Taro's image in the young hero in his final moments.

Episodes

Ultra Galaxy Fight: New Generation Heroes
 is the first of the Ultra Galaxy Fight miniseries, airing from September 29 to December 22, 2019, while coinciding its release with the second half of Ultraman Taiga. The end of New Generation Heroes lead to the cold opening of Ultraman Taiga picking off where the titular team were chasing Tregear while the Tri-Squad continue the fight in their predecessors' place. In addition, the miniseries imported characters from different multimedia instalments of Ultra Series, the antagonist Ultra Dark-Killer from the pachinko game series and Ultraman Ribut from Tsuburaya Productions' previous collaboration Upin & Ipin animation series.

Ultraman Taiga The Movie
 is the film adaptation of Ultraman Taiga announced on December 15, 2019, at Tokyo Dome City during Tsuburaya Productions' Tsubucon. In addition to the original cast members of the series, the movie incorporates guest appearance of the previous New Generation Heroes. The movie was initially delayed from its original release date (March 6, 2020) as a result of the ongoing COVID-19 pandemic in Japan before it received a new one on August 7.

The film centers around Hiroyuki as the target of an unidentified opponent, forcing other members of the New Generation Heroes to appear one after another and together challenge the power of a great darkness. In addition, Taiga's father, Ultraman Taro, has come to Earth but attacked his own son under mysterious circumstances.

Tri-Squad Voice Drama
 is an audio drama streamed on Tsuburaya Productions' YouTube channel.

In addition to the serial above, special episodes were also included in different publications:
, is included on the music album Ultraman Taiga Character Song CD.
, is included in Ultraman Taiga Blu-ray Box I release on November 25, 2019.
, is included in Ultraman Taiga Blu-ray Box II release on February 27, 2020.

Other media

Succeeding appearances
Ultra Galaxy Fight: The Absolute Conspiracy (2020): The Tri-Squad made their return as one of the miniseries' characters. It also featured an alternate version of Tregear's past self as one of the miniseries' major characters.

Production and casting
Ultraman Taiga was officially announced on April 18, 2019, by Tsuburaya Production on their website.

Cast
: 
: 
: 
: 
: 
: 
: 
: 
: 
Opening narrator:

Guest cast

: 
: 
: 
: 
: 
: 
: 
: 
:

Songs
Opening theme
"Buddy, steady, go!"
Composition & Arrangement: 
Lyrics & Artist: 
Episodes: 1–13, 26 (Verse 1); 14-24 (Verse 2)
In episode 25, this song is played as an ending theme.

Ending themes

Composition & Arrangement: 
Lyrics & Artist: 
Episodes: 1-13
In episode 26, this song is played as an insert theme.
"Sign"
Lyrics: 
Composition & Arrangement:  (Arte Refact)
Artist: Sphere
Episodes: 14-24
In episode 26, this song is played as an insert theme.

Insert themes

Lyrics: 
Composition & Arrangement:  (Arte Refact)
Artist: Ultraman Fuma (Shōta Hayama)
Episodes: 13, 22
WISE MAN'S PUNCH
Lyrics: Erica Masaki
Composition & Arrangement:  (Arte Refact)
Artist: Ultraman Titas (Satoshi Hino)
Episodes: 13

Lyrics: Erica Masaki
Composition: Yuki Honda (Arte Refact)
Arrangement:  (Arte Refact)
Artist: Ultraman Taiga (Takuma Terashima)
Episodes: 13, 26

International broadcast
In Hong Kong, this series aired on ViuTV on July 4, 2020.

See also
Ultra Series - Complete list of official Ultraman-related shows.

Notes

References

External links
Ultraman Taiga at Tsuburaya Productions 
Ultraman Taiga at TV Tokyo 

2019 Japanese television series debuts
Ultra television series
TV Tokyo original programming
Fictional trios